The East Asian languages are a language family (alternatively macrofamily or superphylum) proposed by Stanley Starosta in 2001. The proposal has since been adopted by George van Driem.

Classifications

Early proposals
Early proposals of similar linguistic macrophylla, in narrower scope:

Austroasiatic, Austronesian, Kra-Dai, Tibeto-Burman: August Conrady (1916, 1922) and Kurt Wulff (1934, 1942)
Austroasiatic, Austronesian, Kra-Dai, Hmong-Mien: Paul K. Benedict (1942), Robert Blust (1996), Ilia Peiros (1998)
Austroasiatic, Austronesian, Kra-Dai, Tibeto-Burman, Hmong-Mien: Stanley Starosta (2001)

Precursors to the East Asian proposal:
Austro-Tai (Kra-Dai and Austronesian): Gustave Schlegel (1901, 1902), Weera Ostapirat (2005)
Austric (Austroasiatic and Austronesian): Wilhelm Schmidt (1906), Lawrence Reid (1994, 2005)

Starosta (2005)

Stanley Starosta's (2005) East Asian proposal includes a "Yangzian" branch, consisting of Austroasiatic and Hmong–Mien, to form an East Asian superphylum. However, Starosta believes his proposed Yangzian to be a direct sister of Sino-Tibetan rather than Austronesian, which is more distantly related to Sino-Tibetan as a sister of Sino-Tibetan-Yangzian. He concludes Proto-East Asian was a disyllabic (CVCVC) language spoken from 6,500 to 6,000 BCE by Peiligang culture and Cishan culture millet farmers on the North China Plain (specifically the Han River, Wei River, and central Yellow River areas).

East Asian
Austronesian
(various Formosan branches)
Extra-Formosan
Tai–Kadai
Malayo-Polynesian
Sino-Tibetan-Yangzian
Sino-Tibetan
Yangzian
Austroasiatic
Hmong–Mien

Starosta (2005) proposes the following Proto-East Asian morphological affixes, which are found in Proto-Tibeto-Burman and Proto-Austronesian, as well as in some morphologically conservative Austroasiatic branches such as Nicobaric.
 *m(V)- 'agent of V-ing'
 *-Vn 'patient of V-ing'
 *sV- 'instrument of V-ing'
 *n(V)- 'perfective'

van Driem (2012)

The following tree of East Asian superphylum (macrofamily) was proposed by George van Driem in 2012 at the 18th Himalayan Languages Symposium, held at the Benares Hindu University.

East Asian
Austro-Tai
Kradai
Austronesian
Austroasiatic
Himalayan-Yangtzean
Trans-Himalayan
Sino-Bodic
Burmo-Qiangic
Brahmaputran
Gongduk, etc.
Kiranti, etc.
Yangtzean
Hmong–Mien

According to van Driem, the linguistic evidence for the East Asian languages matches the genetic evidence from Y-DNA Haplogroup O. (Further information: Father Tongue hypothesis)

Larish (2006, 2017) 
According to Michael D. Larish, the languages of Southeast and East Asia descended from one proto-language (which he calls "Proto-Asian"). Japonic is grouped together with Koreanic as one branch of the Proto-Asian family. The other branch consists of the Austronesian, Austroasiatic, Kra-Dai, Hmong-Mien and Sino-Tibetan languages.

East Asian
Japano-Koreanic
Japonic
Koreanic
Austro-Asian
Austronesian
Austroasiatic
Kra-Dai
Hmong-Mien
Sino-Tibetan

Vocabulary comparison
Below is a comparison of basic vocabulary items for proto-languages of all 5 East Asian language families.

Sources
 Proto-Tibeto-Burman: Matisoff (2015)
 Proto-Hmong-Mien: Ratliff (2010)
 Proto-Austroasiatic: Sidwell & Rau (2015)
 Proto-Austronesian: Blust & Trussel (2020)
 Proto-Tai: Pittayaporn (2009)
 Proto-Hlai: Norquest (2007)
 Proto-Kra: Ostapirat (2000)

Distributions

See also
Father Tongue hypothesis
Classification schemes for Southeast Asian languages
Sino-Austronesian languages
Austric languages
Austro-Tai languages
Mainland Southeast Asia linguistic area
Haplogroup O (Y-DNA)
Languages of East Asia
Languages of Southeast Asia
Languages of China

Notes and references

External links
Papers on the East Asian languages by George van Driem

Proposed language families